Chicks on Speed is a feminist music and fine art ensemble, formed in Munich in 1997, after members Australian Alex Murray-Leslie and American Melissa Logan met at the Munich Academy of Fine Arts.

Though Chicks on Speed reached cult status throughout the 2000s as catalysts of the musical genre electroclash, the band was  founded and more broadly, performed as a multidisciplinary art group working in performance art, electronic dance music, collage graphics, textile design, and fashion.

History
The co-founders, Melissa Logan and Alex Murray-Leslie were art students at the Academy of Fine Arts, Munich, when they met in 1997 at one of the Academy's parties.

Murray-Leslie then invited Logan to join an illegal bar she founded, named  "Seppi Bar" that same year. Logan and Murray-Leslie began working as a group at Seppi Bar to create art exhibitions and host illegal parties.

Murray-Leslie founded  "Seppi Bar", which was originally named "Maria Bar" earlier, in 1994, with friends Barbara and Karl Fritsch, she later changed the name to  "Seppi Bar" in 1996. It was a nomadic ArtBar around Munich that lasted 3 years. It was a project based on the Cabaret Voltaire in Zurich where Dada artists met and performed. 

After a seminar by Roberto Ohrt on the Situationist International Logan asked Murray-Leslie to leave the lecture and in the hallway said they should be an art collective, a large radical group but without the boss structure of Guy Debord, they would be a collective with equal leadership, horizontal. Later Logan and Kiki Moorse met through their Japanese boyfriends. Moorse came from fashion, formally an editor at Condé Nast. Moorse was a performer in an early Chicks on Speed video (Für die Bessere Welt/ for the better world, Seppi welt ist besser/ (a member until 2006 now on Toffeetones Records), after which she invited her to join Chicks on Speed. In this period, Murray-Leslie worked with Upstart at the techno nightclub Ultraschall working the door, curating live-art events and interior media art installations. This meeting with Upstart (Label owner of Disko B) would see the medium of music merge with the Chicks' multimedia explorations.

Chicks on Speed created a live-art piece named I Wanna Be A DJ...Baby!. They stood behind DJ decks and smashed records while a sound collage tape was playing. For this project they also put together a "box set" with a T-shirt, a cassette, a paper record and a fake interview for their "band". During this time they met Upstart (a.k.a. Peter Wacha) of Disko B record label who joined their freshly started record label, Go Records, which later become Chicks on Speed Records with Jeurgen Söder. Go Records was a suicide label—the release numbers started at 10 and went down to zero; the motto was, perhaps what is wrong with the world is that things are made to grow & get bigger. The 10 releases were primarily limited edition 7" and 10" records that sold out fast.

Philosophy
In an interview with Undertheradar.co.nz, Melissa Logan, a founding and current member stated, "We are humanists. Feminism is a small and at the same time a great part of this. Besides the obvious deserved rights for females through sexual equality, equality offers white males a way out of the white male oppressor role." Logan states that their political activism is a form of feminism and that their form of feminism does not have to fit into a box. She asserts, "We were confused and aggressive: what do you mean, we’re feminists? We’re just making our work. And then, at the time, I had a really political boyfriend, who said, yes, you guys are really political, if you’re not feminists you can’t do what you want to do. It doesn’t mean that there’s a definition and you have to fit with it – you can make your own definition of it – and then it was oh yeah."

Music

A cassette titled Analog Internet was the first piece of music released by Chicks On Speed. The cassette was released in 1997, though it seems widely agreed that the first Chicks on Speed single was a cover of the song "Warm Leatherette", originally by Daniel Miller (as The Normal), released in 7" form. The single was released in 1998 and four further singles ("Smash Metal", "Euro Trash Girl" (originally by Cracker in 1993), "Mind Your Own Business" (originally by Delta 5 in 1979) and "Glamour Girl" over 1998 and 1999) preceded any actual album releases. In March 2000, two Chicks on Speed LPs were released; the first, titled The Un-Releases, is not considered an official album, instead described as a "collage" of various songs in various forms. Chicks on Speed's debut, Chicks On Speed Will Save Us All appeared later in the month and featured all five of the previous singles as well as a new one, "Kaltes Klares Wasser", a cover of a song by the German all-women punk band Malaria!. All six of these singles proved popular and in October 2000, The Re-Releases Of The Un-Releases was issued.

Several EPs were issued over the next few years such as chix 52, a collection of B-52's covers and Fashion Rules that heralded the arrival of the 2003 second album 99 Cents released on Chicks on Speed records and licensed to EMI. The album produced three more singles: "We Don't Play Guitars", a collaboration with Canadian artist Peaches, which was a hit around the world; a cover of Tom Tom Club's "Wordy Rappinghood" which saw a number of guest stars including Le Tigre; and "Flame On", a hidden track on the album with Mika Vanio. By this time Chicks on Speed have already been collaborating with Anat Ben-David, an unofficial band member working with them since 2002.

In 2004, their third album, Press The Spacebar was released. The album was a collaboration with the Spanish band The No-Heads and Cristian Vogel. No singles were issued from the album, though it included a new version of "Culture Vulture", a song from their previous LP release 99 Cents.

In November 2006, Chicks on Speed released the 12" single "Art Rules" produced with Christopher Just, with guests Anat Ben David and Turner prize artist Douglas Gordon; after the release, Chicks on Speed concentrated on live art performances under the same name and toured art institutions the world over, collaborating with A.L. Steiner, Anat Ben David, Kathi Glas and Adi Nachman.

Chicks on Speed began researching and developing ObjektInstruments (self-made musical instruments) in 2005 for studio and stage implementation, and held a solo exhibition presenting the instruments in a performative installation at Dundee Contemporary Arts Centre in 2010.

2011–2013 Chicks on Speed were Artist Residents at ZKM, Centre for Art and Media, Karlsruhe producing the new Chicks on Speed album UTOPIA and a series of 6 APP's as musical instruments for interactive stage performances. Chicks on Speed collaborated with Julian Assange, Yoko Ono, Peter Weible and Francesca Thyssen, Anat Ben David, Angie Seah, Oliver Horton and Christopher Just on the album UTOPIA released September 2014.

Other artistic endeavours
Chicks on Speed's work is not limited to one specific field, but rather encompasses various forms of creative expression, resulting in a unique and diverse body of work. They run a record label, Chicks On Speed Records, together with Peter Wacha, Juergen Söder and Gero Loferer (design), releasing recordings by Le Tigre, Kevin Blechdom, Planningtorock, Gustav, Ana da Silva of The Raincoats, DAT Politics, Susanne Brokesch, Kids on TV, Anat Ben-David, Angie Reed and the Girl Monster compilation series.

Chicks on Speed's interest lies in art, something that also characterises their live performances. Major solo art exhibitions include Kunstverein Wolfsburg 2004, Kunstraum Innsbruck 2005, CAC Vilnius 2007, Kunstraum Kreuzberg 2010, Dundee Contemporary Arts 2011, ArtSpace Sydney, Institute of Modern Art, Brisbane 2013 and Design Hub RMIT University, Melbourne, 2014. Group exhibitions include "Kiss Kiss Bang Bang", Bilbao Fine Arts Museum 2007 and "Switch On the Power", Vigo, Spain 2006. XMas, Sell-Out, and ChicksTV. Chicks on Speed performed at Australian Pavilion vernisage, 55th Venice Biennale and Museum of Contemporary Art Sydney, 2013, Thyssen Bornemisza Art Contemporary 2012, Turner Prize Retrospective at the Tate in October 2007, and at MoMA in June 2006, as part of a special evening with Douglas Gordon. Their work with Douglas Gordon included a performance at the Centre Georges Pompidou in February 2007, Collection TBA-21 hosted a performance in Vienna in April 2007, and an exhibition at Yvonne Lambert in Paris in September 2007. They have been responsible for the cover art for various other artists, particularly ones signed to their label and Mego Records in Vienna.

Chicks on Speed's focus on fashion began in 1997 with their first stage costumes; these developed into a longtime collaboration with Kathi Glas, and more recently with Peggy Noland, Ari Fish and Jeremy Scott. The fashion side of Chicks on Speed has grown into collaborations with independent fashion brands, including textile yardages for Crystal Ball Japan in 2007/2008, DAA (Designers Against Aids) and Hennes and Mauritz "Fashion Against Aids" in 2008. In 2009, Chicks on Speed and Insight launched the project, Insight on Chicks on Speed, with a range of girls' surf wear, and a song and video, titled "Super Surfer Girl". They are currently working on a larger collaboration with another larger brand.

Logan and Murray-Leslie published 2 books with Booth-Clibborn Editions, : Chicks on Speed: It's A Project 2005 containing historical pieces of information about the band and their art from their beginning stages onward, including a dress, a DIY pattern to make overalls, designed by Chicks on Speed and Jeremy Scott, a CD of unreleased music and a poster, all together in a tote bag designed by Chicks on Speed. "Chicks on Speed Don't Art, Fashion, Music 2011".

Chicks on Speed's series of what they call ObjectInstruments sees the group shy away from filling the stage with conventional band instruments, they invented their own instruments, which at times double as fashionable stage outfits –for example: Super suits, outfits which remotely trigger audio/video, and an haute couture hat which is a self-contained amplification device.

The 2010 exhibition "Chicks on Speed Don't, Art, fashion, Music" at Dundee Contemporary Arts Centre was their first major solo exhibition in the UK. Chicks on Speed opened with a live art performance for invited guests, featuring the 'e-shoe' – the world's first wireless high-heeled shoe guitar, made in collaboration with Milan-based shoe designer Max Kibardin and Hangar.org. These shoes were unveiled alongside Chicks on Speed's ever-growing collection of self made ‘objektinstruments’ – A Theremin Tapestry, cigar-box synthesizers, super suits with sewn-in body sensors that trigger audio/video samples and two hats made in collaboration with Christophe Coppins and Hangar.org, based on illuminated drawings of Hildegard von Bingen, a 12th-century Christian mystic who received visions, composed ethereal airs, performed healings and even founded convents. These hats transmit the utterances of their wearers by way of microphones and speakers.

The DCA galleries were further transformed into a giant stage and studio set for making music videos, experimenting with no-choreography and ongoing craft projects live, including loom-weaving inspired by Bauhaus design, lectures and workshops, film screenings of their fashion archive and selected video pieces. Chicks on Speed worked with local and international makers to combine traditional craft with cutting-edge technology.

In 2013 & 2014, Chicks on Speed toured their major solo interactive multimedia exhibition SCREAM to global cultural institutions:
ArtSpace, Sydney, RMIT Design Hub Melbourne, Fremantle Arts Centre, Perth, Institute of Modern Art, Brisbane and Institute of Contemporary Art, Singapore.

Solo activities of the members
Melissa E Logan is represented by Gallerie Gisela Clement, Bonn, Germany. The gallery represented a solo booth of Logans painting at the 51st Art Cologne, April 2017. Simultaneously Logan premiered a one-hour sound piece at Schauspiel Köln titles Cetacea. it was performed on three consecutive evenings and is part one of the five part: The Ursula Series, sound works for the post human planet. Cetacea is composed in two versions, one for humans, the other is made in the sound range audible to whales. The section titled Quartetris, started in 2014, is being created by robots for humans to perform mimicking dystopian theory of machines controlling humans. Her first solo exhibition there was April 15, 2016 University of Craft Action Thought, Flags. The exhibition was expanded as a collaborative exhibitions in GRAD, European Center for Art and Debate, Belgrad September 11, 2016.

In 2001, Logan, together with Chicks on Speed producer Thies Mynther and chiptune composer Rob Hubbard, released the single "Mutants, Here I Am" under the band name Plundersonics.
 
Logan composed music for Mathilde ter Heigne and for theatre. Kippenberger written and directed by Angela Richter at Schauspiel Köln. Logan appeared in theater plays by the director Angela Richter Versaut (with costumes by Kate Lloyd-Hughes and Chicks on Speed; at Kampnagel Theatre, Hamburg, 2001), Alles wird in Flammen stehen (Frank Gehry Tower, Hannover, 2001) and a "propaganda operette" L'Amerique (Hamburg, 2003). L'Amerique'''s "soundtrack" (with music by Les Robespierres featuring Melissa Logan) has been released on Chicks on Speed Records in 2004. She has worked with the theater and dance directors Gintersdorfer/Klassen from 2010 on. Die Geselschaft des Bösen, Erleide Meine Inspiration are theater productions she has acted in. The collaboration includes music, a mix of ivorien Coupè de calè, combined with electroclash. New Black is the resulting album produced in Abidjan Ivory Coast, Berlin, Austria and Hamburg, released on Buback, Hamburg.

Alex Murray-Leslie has created numerous site specific multimedia performance projects including: 2008/09 acoustic-art-fashion performance, "A Hanging Garden Party" with Pelican Avenue and Choreographer Krõõt Juurak, Tokyo & Paris Fashion week, 2010/2011 "Prototype Hits" with Anat Ben-david at Kampnagel Theatre, Mannheim National Theatre, Le Struch Media Art Centre Sabadell, Spain, 2012, "These Shoes are Made for Painting" with Max Kibardin and Anat Ben-David, Milan Fashion Week, "Gala's Invitation" with Anat-Ben-david, 2013 "Colour Tuning", Bon Marche Theatre, Sydney and Seam Symposium "Audience Authorship, Curation", Sydney.

2011–2012 Murray-Leslie was invited to the position of Entertainment Manager at Americas Cup sporting event, visioning and curating Live music and Art events in Plymouth, San Diego, Cascais and San Francisco, followed by Alex becoming director at Diane Pernet's "A Shaded View on Fashion Film", CaixaForum Barcelona. She is professor of Soundtrack and Fashion Film at Elisava, Pompeu Fabra University, Instituto Eureopeo de Designo Barcelona and lectures at Interface Cultures, University of Art and Design, Linz.

Alex Murray-Leslie is currently undertaking a PhD in Musical Instrument design for multimedia performance, Creativity and Cognition Studios, Department of Engineering and IT, University of Technology, Sydney, Australia.

Murray-Leslie founded and curated the compilation Girl Monster in 2006, featuring sixty two women in cutting edge music from the late 1970s to present day, released on Chicks on Speed Records. The "Girl Monster" 12" single, featured Scream Club, Client, Chicks on Speed, Vivien Goldman and Kids on TV.

Current members
 Alex Murray-Leslie (Bowral, New South Wales, Australia)
 Melissa Logan (Upstate New York, United States)

Discography
Albums
 The Un-Releases (1999)
 Chicks On Speed Will Save Us All (2000)
 The Re-Releases of the Un-Releases (2001)
 99 Cents (2003)
 Press the Spacebar (with the No Heads) (2004)
 Cutting The Edge (2009)
 artstravaganza (2014)

EPs and singles
 "Warm Leatherette" (with DJ Hell) (1997)
 "Euro Trash Girl" (with Mäuse) (1998)
 "Smash Metal" (with DMX Krew) (1999)
 "Mind Your Own Business" (with Pulsinger, Gaier/Reents) (1999)
 "Glamour Girl" (1999)
 "Kaltes Klares Wasser" (2000)
 "Split 7" with V/VM" (2000)
 "Chix 52" (2000)
 "The Chicks on Speed / Kreidler Sessions" (with Kreidler) (2001)
 "Fashion Rules" (2002)
 "We Don't Play Guitars" (2003)
 "Wordy Rappinghood" (2003) – UK 66
 "Flame On" (with Mika Vainio) (2004)
 "What Was Her Name?" (2004) (Dave Clarke featuring Chicks on Speed) – UK #50
 "Art Rules" (2007)
 "Super Surfer Girl" (2008)
 "10 Years Thyssen Bornemisza Art Contemporary 21-Art Dump" (2012)
 UTOPIA (2014)
 "We Are Data" (remix) Cora Nova (2017)
 "Vaccinate Me Baby" (2021)

References

 Piers Martin, Chicks on Speed in The Face Vol. 3, No 38, March 2000
 Steven Wells, International Punky Art Rockers: Chicks on Speed in NME'', 8 January 2000

External links

 The Official Chicks on Speed Site

K Records artists
EMI Records artists
German electronic rock musical groups
All-female bands
Ableton Live users
Electroclash groups
Feminism and the arts
Humanists
Musical groups established in 1997
Women in electronic music